İpek University was a private university in Çankaya, the central district of Ankara, Turkey. Established in 2011, the university was one out of fifteen private universities that were closed by the Turkish government in the course of the 2016 Turkish purges.

Gallery

References

External links
  

Private universities and colleges in Turkey
Universities and colleges in Ankara
Educational institutions established in 2011
2011 establishments in Turkey
Educational institutions shut down in the 2016 Turkish purges
Defunct universities and colleges in Turkey